A preacher is a person who delivers sermons or homilies on religious topics to an assembly of people. Less common are preachers who preach on the street, or those whose message is not necessarily religious, but who preach components such as a moral or social worldview or philosophy.

History
Preachers are common throughout most cultures. They can take the form of a Christian minister on a Sunday morning, or an Islamic Imam. A Muslim preacher in general is referred to as a dā‘ī, while one giving sermons on a Friday afternoon is called a khatib.

The sermon or homily has been an important part of Christian services since Early Christianity, and remains prominent in both Roman Catholicism and Protestantism. Lay preachers sometimes figure in these traditions of worship, for example the Methodist local preachers, but in general preaching has usually been a function of the clergy. The Dominican Order is officially known as the Order of Preachers (Ordo Praedicatorum in Latin); friars of this order were trained to publicly preach in vernacular languages, and the order was created by Saint Dominic to preach to the Cathars of southern France in the early thirteenth century. The Franciscans are another important preaching order; Travelling preachers, usually friars, were an important feature of late medieval Catholicism.

In most denominations, modern preaching is kept below about 40 minutes, but historic preachers of all denominations could at times speak for well over an hour, sometimes for two or three hours, and use techniques of rhetoric and theatre that are today somewhat out of fashion in mainline churches.

In many churches in the United States, the title "Preacher" is synonymous with "pastor" or "minister", and the church's minister is often referred to simply as "our/the preacher" or by name such as "Preacher Smith". However, among some Chinese churches, preacher (Chinese: 傳道) is different from pastor (Chinese: 牧師). A preacher in the Protestant church is one of the younger clergy, but they are not officially recognised as pastors until they can prove their capability of leading the church.

Other uses

Preacher is also the supposed author of the Book of Ecclesiastes. Preacher is one translation of the Hebrew word קהלת (Qoheleth). There is much debate about the identity of this preacher; many believe it is Solomon.

See also
 Child preacher
 List of Christian preachers
 Clergy
 Da'i
 Maggid
 Preacher's kid

Notes

References
 Francis, Keith A., Gibson, William, et al., The Oxford Handbook of the British Sermon 1689–1901, 2012 OUP, google books

External links
 

Christian clergy by type
Religious terminology
Religious occupations